Statistics of Premier League of Bosnia and Herzegovina in the 2003–2004 season.

Overview
It was contested by 16 teams, and NK Široki Brijeg won the championship.

Clubs and stadiums

League standings

Results

Top goalscorers

References
Bosnia-Herzegovina - List of final tables (RSSSF)

Premier League of Bosnia and Herzegovina seasons
1
Bosnia